"The Winner Takes It All" is a song recorded by Swedish pop group ABBA. Released as the first single from the group's seventh studio album, Super Trouper (1980), it is a ballad in the key of G-flat major, reflecting on the end of a relationship. The single's B-side was the non-album track "Elaine". The song peaked at No.1 in several countries, including the UK, where it became their eighth chart-topper. It was also the group's final top 10 hit in the United States. It was written by Björn Ulvaeus and Benny Andersson, with Agnetha Fältskog singing the lead vocal.

In a 1999 poll for Channel 5, "The Winner Takes It All" was voted Britain's favourite ABBA song. This feat was replicated in a 2010 poll for ITV. In a 2006 poll for a Channel Five programme, "The Winner Takes It All" was voted "Britain's Favourite Break-Up Song."

Background
Ulvaeus and Andersson started writing "The Winner Takes It All" in the summer of 1979 in a cottage on the island of Viggsö. According to Andersson, the idea for the song suddenly came up "from old ideas, from old small musical pieces" they had.  The demo had an original title of "The Story of My Life" and the first arrangement for the song was uptempo with a constant beat. However, they felt their first effort "much too stiff and metrical", so they left the song for a few days while they worked on other songs.  Four days later they returned to the song, and Andersson came up the idea of using a French chanson-style arrangement with a descending piano line and a looser structure. Ulvaeus then recorded a demo using nonsense French words for lyrics, and took the recording home to write the lyrics for "The Winner Takes It All". According to Ulvaeus, he drank whiskey while he was writing, and it was the quickest lyrics he ever wrote. He said, "I was drunk, and the whole lyric came to me in a rush of emotion in one hour." Ulvaeus said that when he gave the lyrics to Fältskog to read, "a tear or two welled up in her eyes. Because the words really affected her."

Ulvaeus denies the song is about his and Fältskog's divorce, saying the basis of the song "is the experience of a divorce, but it's fiction. 'Cause one thing I can say is that there wasn't a winner or a loser in our case. A lot of people think it's straight out of reality, but it's not". However, Ulvaeus admitted that the heartache of their breakup inspired the song, but noted that the words in the song should not be taken literally. He said: "Neither Agnetha nor I were winners in our divorce." American critic Chuck Klosterman, who says "The Winner Takes It All" is "[the only] pop song that examines the self-aware guilt one feels when talking to a person who has humanely obliterated your heart" finds Ulvaeus' denial hard to believe in light of the original title. The booklet for the double CD compilation The Definitive Collection states "The Winner Takes It All" is the song where Bjorn admits that the sad experience of his and Agnetha's divorce the previous year left its mark on the lyrics."

Reception
Record World said of it that "Gripping vocal drama is augmented forcefully by plush orchestration."

Chart performance
"The Winner Takes It All" was a major success for ABBA, hitting No. 1 in Belgium, Ireland, the Netherlands, South Africa and the United Kingdom. It reached the Top 5 in Austria, Finland, France, West Germany, Norway, Sweden, Switzerland and Zimbabwe, while peaking in the Top 10 in Australia, Canada, Italy, Spain and the United States (where it became ABBA's fourth and final American Top 10 hit, peaking at No. 8; the song spent 26 weeks on the Billboard Hot 100 chart, more than any other ABBA single). It was also the group's second Billboard Adult Contemporary #1 (after "Fernando"). "The Winner Takes It All" was also a hit in Brazil: it was included on the soundtrack of "Coração Alado" ("Winged Heart"), a popular soap opera in 1980, as the main theme.

The track was listed as the 23rd most popular single on the US Billboard year-end chart for 1981.

As of September 2021, it is the group's fifth-biggest song in the UK with 920,000 chart sales (including pure sales and streaming numbers).

Music video

A music video to promote the song was filmed in July 1980 on Marstrand, an island on the Swedish west coast. It was directed by Lasse Hallström. Appropriately, the video was shot ten days after the divorce of Björn Ulvaeus and Agnetha Fältskog was officially declared by the courts. It starts with a black-and-white photo montage of ABBA, then moves to the face of Agnetha singing the song. Interspersed in the video are footages of her walking alone, still photographs and other happier members of the band.

Track listing

Personnel
 Agnetha Fältskog – lead vocals
 Anni-Frid Lyngstad – backing vocals
 Björn Ulvaeus – backing vocals
 Benny Andersson – keyboards & synthesizers, backing vocals

Additional musicians
 Ola Brunkert – drums
 Mike Watson – bass
 Lasse Wellander – guitars
 Rutger Gunnarsson – string arrangements

Charts

Weekly charts

Year-end charts

Certifications and sales

Covers

Cher covered the song for her 2018 album Dancing Queen, inspired by Mamma Mia! Here We Go Again, in which she starred.
 Beverley Craven covered the song for her 1993 album Love Scenes.
 E-Rotic covered the song on their 1997 album Thank You For The Music
 Carla Bruni covered the song in her 2017 album French Touch.
 Susan Boyle covered the song for her 2012 album Standing Ovation: The Greatest Songs from the Stage.
 At Vance covered the song for their 2001 album Dragonchaser.
 The song is covered in the finale of TV series Glee by Jane Lynch and Matthew Morrison as Sue Sylvester and Will Schuester respectively.
 In 2010, Liverpudlian singer Tor James Faulkner covered the track on his album The Reflection to raise money and awareness for eating disorder charity Beat.
 In 1980, a Czech version (A ty se ptáš, co já – And you are asking what about me) was recorded by Czech singer Helena Vondráčková, with the lyrics by Zdeněk Borovec.
 In September 2021, Rick Astley performed a stripped-back piano cover version of this song.
 The song is featured as a number in the ABBA-based musical Mamma Mia!. In the film adaptation, it is performed by Meryl Streep as Donna Sheridan.
 On 19 July 2022, English singer Megan McKenna released a country version of the song.
 Kylie Minogue and her sister Dannii Minogue covered the song for the soundtrack of the TV series Beautiful People.

In popular culture
 The song is featured in the episode "Winner" in season four finale of Better Call Saul; a karaoke version is sung by characters Jimmy McGill and Chuck McGill, played by Bob Odenkirk and Michael McKean respectively. The episode's title is most likely a reference to the song as well.
 In season 1 of The Trip, Rob Brydon and Steve Coogan discuss the lyrical intent of the song in episode 5, and then give a fulsome and lusty rendition of the number whilst driving on the motorway in episode 6.

See also
List of Billboard Adult Contemporary number ones of 1981

References

External links
 

1980s ballads
1980 singles
ABBA songs
European Hot 100 Singles number-one singles
UK Singles Chart number-one singles
Irish Singles Chart number-one singles
Dutch Top 40 number-one singles
Pop ballads
Songs written by Benny Andersson and Björn Ulvaeus
Hazell Dean songs
Polar Music singles
Music videos directed by Lasse Hallström
1980 songs
Songs about divorce
Rick Astley songs